The 2004 Pan American Judo Championships in Margarita Island, Venezuela from 19 April to 24 April 2004.

Medal overview

Men's events

Women's events

Medals table

Notes

External links
 
 PJU (Official results, 1st day)
 PJU (Official results, 2nd day)
 http://www.pju.org/nuevo/documentos/pansen2004ven/cuadro%20de%20medallas%20-%20GENERAL.jpg

American Championships
Judo
2004
Judo competitions in Venezuela
International sports competitions hosted by Venezuela